The Ulster Folk Museum and the Ulster Transport Museum are situated in Cultra, Northern Ireland, about  east of the city of Belfast. The Folk Museum endeavours to illustrate the way of life and traditions of the people in Northern Ireland, past and present, while the Transport Museum explores and exhibits methods of transport by land, sea and air, past and present. The museums rank among Ireland's foremost visitor attractions and is a former Irish Museum of the Year. The location houses two of four museums included in National Museums Northern Ireland.

History
Created by an Act of Parliament in 1958, the Folk Museum was created to preserve a rural way of life in danger of disappearing forever due to increasing urbanisation and industrialisation in Northern Ireland. The site the museum occupies was formally the Estate of Sir Robert Kennedy, and was acquired in 1961, with the museum opening to the public for the first time three years later in 1964. In 1967, the Folk Museum merged with the Belfast Transport Museum (located on Witham Street in the city), to form the Ulster Folk and Transport Museum. In 1993, the Transport Museum moved into new Rail and Road Galleries in Cultra, close to the Folk Museum site. The galleries were subsequently expanded in 1996. In 1998, the Ulster Folk and Transport Museum merged with the Ulster Museum and the Ulster-American Folk Park to form the National Museums and Galleries of Northern Ireland, now National Museums Northern Ireland.

Folk Museum

The Folk Museum houses a variety of old buildings and dwellings which have been collected from various parts of Ireland and rebuilt in the grounds of the museum, brick by brick.  are devoted to illustrating the rural way of life in the early 20th century, and visitors can stroll through a recreation of the period's countryside complete with farms, cottages, crops, livestock, and visit a typical Ulster town of the time called "Ballycultra", featuring shops, churches, and both terraced and larger housing and a Tea room. Regular activities include open hearth cooking, printing, needlework, and traditional Irish crafts demonstrations. All these new developments have aided UFM in developing a new visitor base and have gained the site international recognition.

The museum is the holder of Northern Ireland's main film, photographic, television and sound archives. The museum holds the BBC Northern Ireland archive of radio and television programmes, and also possesses over 2,000 hours of sound material broadcast between 1972 and 2002 by the Irish language radio station RTÉ Raidió na Gaeltachta, from its studios in Derrybeg, County Donegal. The museum also maintains an archive of Ulster dialects, and a large library containing over 15,000 books and periodicals. The archives and library are open to the public during office hours.

Transport Museum

The Transport Museum houses an extensive transport collection, and endeavours to tell the story of transport in Ireland, from its early history to the modern era. It is the largest railway collection in Ireland.

The Irish Railway Collection tells the story of over 150 years of railway history. Steam locomotives, passenger carriages and goods wagons are combined with extensive railway memorabilia, interactive displays and visitor facilities. One of the collection's main attractions is Great Southern Railways Class 800 locomotive No. 800 Maeḋḃ, one of the three largest and most powerful steam locomotives ever to be built and run in Ireland.

The new Road Transport Galleries boast a large collection of vehicles ranging from cycles and motorcycles to trams, buses, and cars. One of its most famous attractions is a DMC DeLorean car, the model made famous by Back to the Future, and manufactured by the DeLorean Motor Company in Belfast.

The museum boasts a permanent Titanic exhibition, documenting the construction, voyage, and eventual sinking of the ill-fated vessel. The ship has long been associated with Northern Ireland, as it was constructed in the Harland and Wolff shipyards, just a few miles from the museum. The newly refurbished Titanic exhibition, tying in with the Folk museum's 'Titanic Trail' is titled TITANICa.

Also on display at the museum is the Shorts manufactured Short SC.1, an experimental vertical take-off aeroplane, only two of which were ever produced. The example in the museum, XG905, crashed in 1963, ending up upside down and killing its pilot.  It was, however, repaired and flown again before eventually being preserved by the museum.

There is the 120 ton steel schooner Result. Recent additions to the collection include a full set of Stanley Woods racing memorabilia, and two of his bikes. Also on display is a Rex McCandless vehicle and an early Formula 1 racing car. A little known fact is that the pogo stick, of which there are examples in the museum, was invented in Comber, County Down. Previously used by local potato farmers to make holes for planting their seed it was later developed by local inventor Archibald Springer who saw potential for its use as a mode of transport and sporting novelty.

Railway and tramway vehicles

Railway connection for visitors

See also

 List of heritage railways in Northern Ireland
 History of rail transport in Ireland
 History of Ireland (1801–1923)
 Culture of Northern Ireland
 Culture of Ireland
 National Museums Northern Ireland

Other museums
 Beamish Museum – County Durham, England
 Black Country Living Museum – Dudley, England
 List of transport museums
 Ulster Museum – Belfast
St Fagans National History Museum – Museum of Welsh Life, Cardiff, Wales.

Notes

External links

 Ulster Folk and Transport Museum official web site
 The Northern Ireland Guide – Ulster Folk and Transport Museum 

National Museums Northern Ireland
Museums established in 1958
Museums established in 1964
Education in County Down
Railway museums in Northern Ireland
Heritage railways in Northern Ireland
Folk museums in the United Kingdom
Archives in Northern Ireland
Museums in County Down
Open-air museums in Northern Ireland
Transport museums in Northern Ireland
Rural history museums in Northern Ireland
1958 establishments in Northern Ireland